Rudolphia is a genus of amphipods in the family Paraleptamphopidae found in Chile.

References

Gammaridea